Palamo is a surname. Notable people with the surname include:

Aveau Niko Palamo, Samoan politician
Thretton Palamo (born 1988), American rugby union player

Samoan-language surnames